Maria Kirilenko and Zheng Jie were the defending champions, but only Zheng chose to participate with Elena Bovina. They lost in the quarterfinals to Vera Dushevina and Lucie Hradecká.
Květa Peschke and Katarina Srebotnik won the title, defeating Raquel Kops-Jones and Abigail Spears 6–0, 6–2 in the final.

Seeds

Draw

Draw

External links
 Main draw

Mercury Insurance Open - Doubles